Darwin is an unincorporated mining community in Inyo County, California, United States. The population was 43 at the 2010 census, down from 54 at the 2000 census.

History
It is named after Darwin French. According to Erwin Gudde, French of Fort Tejon was with a party of prospectors in the area during the fall of 1850.  French also led a party into Death Valley in 1860 to search for the mythical Gunsight Lode via the local wash, lending his first name to the wash, canyon, and future town.

Silver and lead discovery at the place led to the founding of a settlement in 1874. A post office opened in 1875, closed for a time in 1902, and remains open. The town prospered when Eichbaum Toll Road opened in 1926, opening Death Valley from the west.  When Death Valley became a National Monument in 1933, it was decided to buy the toll road to allow free access to the new park.  In 1937, a new cutoff bypassed Darwin, isolating the town.

The town was the subject of a 2011 documentary film Darwin. In April 2012, BBC News featured a video of local residents describing their wishes to replace dial-up Internet access with broadband.

Geography
The census definition of the area was created by the Census Bureau for statistical purposes and may not precisely correspond to local understanding of the area with the same name.

Demographics

For statistical purposes, the United States Census Bureau has defined Darwin as a census-designated place (CDP).

2010
At the 2010 census, Darwin had a population of 43. The racial makeup of Darwin was 38 (88%) white, 0 (0%) black, 2 (5%) Native American, 1 (2%) Asian American, 1 (2%) Pacific Islander, 0 (0%) from other races, and 1 (2%) from two or more races. Hispanic or Latino of any race were 2 people (5%).

The whole population lived in households, no one lived in non-institutionalized group quarters and no one was institutionalized. 

There were 28 households; 0 (0%) had children under the age of 18 living in them, 11 (39%) were opposite-sex married couples living together, 0 (0%) had a female householder with no husband present, and 1 (4%) had a male householder with no wife present. There were 1 (4%) unmarried opposite-sex partnerships and 0 (0%) same-sex married couples or partnerships. 14 households (50%) were made up of individuals, and 9 (32%) had someone living alone who was 65 or older. The average household size was 1.5. There were 12 families (43% of households); the average family size was 2.1.

The age distribution was 0 people (0%) under the age of 18, 0 people (0%) aged 18 to 24, 2 people (5%) aged 25 to 44, 20 people (47%) aged 45 to 64, and 21 people (49%) who were 65 or older. The median age was 63.5 years. For every 100 females, there were 168.8 males.  For every 100 females age 18 and over, there were 168.8 males.

The homeowner vacancy rate was 4%; the rental vacancy rate was 0%. 37 people (86% of the population) lived in owner-occupied housing units, and 6 people (14%) lived in rental housing units.

2000
At the 2000 census, there were 54 people, 36 households, and 14 families in the CDP. The racial makeup of the CDP was 91% White, 2% Black or African American, 4% Native American, and 4% from two or more races. 6% of the population were Hispanic or Latino of any race.
Of the 36 households, 8% had children under the age of 18 living with them, 22% were married couples living together, 14% had a female householder with no husband present, and 6% were non-families. 56% of households were one person, and 8% were one person aged 65 or older. The average household size was 1.5, and the average family size was 2.0.

The age distribution was 6% under the age of 18, 2% from 18 to 24, 17% from 25 to 44, 59% from 45 to 64, and 17% 65 or older. The median age was 53 years. For every 100 females, there were 145.5 males. For every 100 females age 18 and over, there were 142.9 males.

The median household income was $13,333, and the median family income was $15,000. Males had a median income of under $2500 versus $36,250 for females. The per capita income for the CDP was $11,048. There were 33% of families and 38% of the population living below the poverty line, including 100% of under eighteens and none of those over 64.

Government

See also
Darwin Falls
Darwin Falls Wilderness
Darwin Hills

References

Further reading
 
 Palazzo, Robert P. Darwin, California, Lake Grove, OR: Western Places, 1996. The history of the boom and bust of this mining town from 1874 to 1878.
 Palazzo, Robert P.  "Post Offices and Postmasters of Inyo County, California 1866-1966", Fernley, NV: MacDonald, 2005.

1875 establishments in California
Census-designated places in California
Census-designated places in Inyo County, California
Populated places established in 1875
Populated places in the Mojave Desert
Mining communities in California